Aleksandar Marelja (born December 6, 1992) is a Serbian professional basketball player for Kazma of the Kuwaiti Division I League.

Professional career
He began his career in the Zemun-based team Zemun Lasta where he played the whole 2009–10 season. He made his professional debut with Radnički KG 06 during the 2010–11 season. He then moved to Sloga Kraljevo in 2011 and played two good seasons with them. In May 2013, he signed a contract with the Spanish team Murcia until the end of season.

Over the summer he worked out with several teams, including Partizan, before finally signing a contract with the Macedonian team ABA Strumica in November 2013. In April 2014, he signed a contract with Borac Čačak until the end of season. Over 14 games in the Basketball League of Serbia, he averaged 13.1 points and 6.2 rebounds per game.

In the summer of 2014, he signed a contract with Mega Vizura. On December 30, 2014, he left Mega and signed with Belgian team Oostende. On March 27, 2016, he parted ways with Oostende.

In August 2016, Marelja signed with KK Vršac. On December 21, 2016, he left Vršac and returned to his former club Mega Leks. On March 4, 2017, he left Mega and signed with Spanish club Real Betis Energía Plus for the rest of the 2016–17 ACB season.

On September 5, 2017, Marelja signed with Belgian club Antwerp Giants. On December 12, 2017, he left Antwerp and signed with Polish club AZS Koszalin.

On August 25, 2019, he has signed with Löwen Braunschweig of the Basketball Bundesliga (BBL).

On July 28, 2020, he has signed with Syntainics MBC of the Basketball Bundesliga.

On July 18, 2021, Marelja signed for Kazma of the Kuwaiti Division I League.

References

External links
 Aleksandar Marelja at aba-liga.com
 Aleksandar Marelja at eurobasket.com
 Aleksandar Marelja at realgm.com

1992 births
Living people
ABA League players
Antwerp Giants players
AZS Koszalin players
Basketball League of Serbia players
Basketball Löwen Braunschweig players
BC Oostende players
CB Murcia players
Centers (basketball)
KK Borac Čačak players
KK Mega Basket players
KK Radnički KG 06 players
KK Sloga players
KK Vršac players
KK Zemun players
Liga ACB players
Mitteldeutscher BC players
Power forwards (basketball)
Real Betis Baloncesto players
Serbian expatriate basketball people in Belgium
Serbian expatriate basketball people in Germany
Serbian expatriate basketball people in Kuwait
Serbian expatriate basketball people in Poland
Serbian expatriate basketball people in North Macedonia
Serbian expatriate basketball people in Spain
Serbian men's basketball players